Bythinella bouloti is a species of very small freshwater snail, an aquatic gastropod mollusk in the family Amnicolidae.

As of 2002, no living animals had been found. Empty shells were used as the basis for the species description.

Distribution

This species is endemic to France. The type locality is a cave in Castelbouc, Sainte-Enimie, Lozère.

Ecology
Bythinella bouloti is probably a troglobite.

References

Bythinella
Endemic molluscs of Metropolitan France
Gastropods described in 2002